Aminia is a branded chain of restaurants with twelve locations in West Bengal, India, which specialises in traditional Mughlai cuisine of Eastern India. The restaurant is most noted for its special Biryani and Aminia Special. It was opened in 1929, and is a growing chain of restaurants within West Bengal. The restaurant is one of the fastest growing restaurants in Eastern India. It has been consistently ranked in the top three Mughlai Restaurants in Kolkata. The first outlet was opened in Zakaria Street opposite the Nakhoda Masjid. Aminia Restaurant does not give franchises, all the restaurants are owned and run by the members of the family since decades.

References

External links
www.aminia.com
Timescity.com
Tollywoodhamaka.com 
Zomato.com
Timesofindia.indiatimes.com
Hillpost.in
Indiatoday.intoday.in
Telegraphindia.com
Thehindu.com

Restaurants in Kolkata
Companies based in Kolkata
Indian companies established in 1929
Restaurants established in 1929